KZGL (103.7 FM) is an alternative rock formatted broadcast radio station licensed to Flagstaff, Arizona, serving Flagstaff and Sedona in Arizona.  KZGL is managed by Murphy Broadcasting.

Station Sold
On Early June 2015, Towers Investment Trust began the process to sell KZGL to Murphy Air, LLC, under the licensee of Murphy Air, LLC, for $850,000.  The sale was closed on September 3, 2015.

References

External links
Murphy Broadcasting website

2007 establishments in Arizona
Active rock radio stations in the United States
Radio stations established in 2007
ZGL